The Chiodo Brothers (Stephen, Charles & Edward Chiodo; ; born in Bronx, New York) are an American trio of sibling special effects artists, specializing in clay modeling, creature creation,  stop motion and animatronics.  Known for their film Killer Klowns from Outer Space and creating puppets and effects for films such as Critters, Ernest Scared Stupid, and Team America: World Police, the Chiodo brothers created the claymation sequence for the Large Marge scene from Pee-wee's Big Adventure, and the stop-motion elements in the North Pole scenes from Elf. They also created the mouse dioramas featured in the 2010 film Dinner for Schmucks, as well as the stop-motion Stone Age creatures in the Cup Noodles ads from the mid-90s and were puppeteers on The Thundermans. In addition, they produced a puppet segment for the episode of The Simpsons "The Fight Before Christmas" (2010). The band Chiodos was originally named "The Chiodos Bros." after them, before modifying their title slightly.

Their studio has made clay animation segments for five episodes of The Simpsons:
 A parody of Davey and Goliath for "HOMR" (2001).
 Parodies of The California Raisins and Santa Claus Is Comin' to Town for 'Tis the Fifteenth Season" (2003).
 A couch gag featuring Gumby for "The Girl Who Slept Too Little" (2005).
 A parody of Wallace and Gromit for "Angry Dad: The Movie" (2011).
 A nightmare sequence parodying Davey and Goliath for "Ned 'n' Edna's Blend Agenda" (2012).

On August 23, 2019, it was announced that the Chiodo Brothers were developing a stop-motion animated adaptation of the book Alien Xmas, written by Stephen Chiodo and Jim Strain, for Netflix with executive producer Jon Favreau. The adaptation, also titled Alien Xmas, was released on Netflix on November 20, 2020.

Credited special effects 
 Flicks (1983) – character masks
 Critters (1986) – critter designer and supervisor
 Faerie Tale Theatre (1986, TV series; 1 episode) – models and effects
 RoboCop-6000 SUX commercial (1987, movie) 
 Critters 2 (1988) – design and supervision: Chiodo Brothers Production, Inc
 UHF (1988) – Clay Animation: Chiodo Bros. Production
 Monsters (1988, TV series; 1 episode) – monster creator
 Critters 3 (1991) – design and supervision: critters crew
 Rubin and Ed (1991) – creator: Simon the Cat
 Ernest Scared Stupid (1991) – creature effects designer
 Critters 4 (1992) – design and supervision: critters crew
 The Stupids (1996) – stop motion animation: Chiodo Bros
 The Mr. Potato Head Show (1998–1999; 13 episodes) – puppet fabrication
 King Cobra (1999) – creature effects
 Survival Island (2002) – creature effects
 Elf (2003) – stop motion animation supervisor : Chiodo Bros
 Team America: World Police (2004) – puppet supervisor
 The Bite-Sized Adventures of Sam Sandwich (2012, TV series) – lead puppet fabricator
 1982 (2013, Short) – special effects
 Alien Abduction (2014) – creature design
 Marcel the Shell With Shoes On (2021) - stop motion animation

References

External links
 
 
 
 

Living people
American people of Italian descent
American puppeteers
People from the Bronx
Special effects people
Sibling trios
Year of birth missing (living people)
American filmmakers
Sibling filmmakers